Brad Tucker (born 9 October 1992 in Christchurch, New Zealand) is a New Zealand rugby union player. He plays lock and flanker for the New York Ironworkers in Major League Rugby (MLR). He previously played for the Seattle Seawolves where he won an MLR Championship in 2019.

Tucker previously played for a number of New Zealand provincial sides in the Mitre 10 Cup but was unable to secure a Super Rugby contract.

Tucker had a successful season with Seattle, winning the championship and earning a place in the all MLR team and being named player of the season.

References

1992 births
Living people
Expatriate rugby union players in the United States
Lincoln University (New Zealand) alumni
New Zealand expatriate rugby union players
New Zealand expatriate sportspeople in the United States
Rugby union players from Christchurch
Seattle Seawolves players
New Zealand rugby union players
Rugby union locks
Rugby union flankers
Waikato rugby union players
Taranaki rugby union players
Manawatu rugby union players
Rugby New York players